Anannya is a women's Bengali-language magazine published fortnightly in Bangladesh since 1987. The magazine has notably championed the role of women in Bangladesh society with its annual awards, which have been given since 1993.

Anannya Top Ten awards

The magazine is noted for its annual awards Anannya Top Ten Awards to outstanding women in Bangladesh since 1993.

References

External links

1987 establishments in Bangladesh
Bengali-language magazines
Biweekly magazines
Magazines established in 1987
Magazines published in Bangladesh
Women's magazines
History of women in Bangladesh